Liam Alan Millar (born September 27, 1999) is a Canadian professional soccer player who plays as a winger for Swiss Super League club Basel and the Canada national team. He featured in the youth ranks of Brampton Youth SC and North Mississauga SC before moving to England to join Fulham Academy aged 13. After three years with Fulham, he joined the Liverpool Academy in 2016.

Early life
Millar was born in Toronto and raised in Brampton and Oakville. He moved to England at the age of 13 for footballing purposes. He began playing soccer at age four with Brampton YSC. Afterwards he played with North Mississauga SC and Burlington YSC.

His father played for Charlton Athletic and is an electrician who works on television series, including Game of Thrones.

Club career

Early career 
Millar began his career with Brampton Youth SC at the age of four. After two years he joined North Mississauga SC and remained at the club until his move to England. He joined Fulham at the age of 13 but felt he struggled to adapt to English football. On moving to England, Millar said "It took me a while to adjust to how English football is, it probably took me a good two-and-a-half years."

Liverpool 

In July 2016, he joined Premier League club Liverpool on a free transfer with striking options limited in the Academy.

Millar scored four minutes into his Liverpool U18s career and marked his debut in the U18 Premier League with a hat-trick in a 4–0 victory against Blackburn Rovers U18s in August 2016. A month later, he signed a professional contract on his 17th birthday. Injury ruled Millar out for three months of his inaugural season but a return in January saw him finish the season with six goals in 17 appearances in the U18 Premier League.

He featured in every game of Liverpool's 2017–18 UEFA Youth League campaign and scored twice in eight games. After 18 months under the guidance of Steven Gerrard in the Under-18s, Millar received his first call-up to the Under-23 squad in January 2018.

He made his senior Liverpool debut on February 4, 2020, starting in the FA Cup fourth-round replay against Shrewsbury Town. He was replaced by Joe Hardy in the 82nd minute. In mid-2020 Liverpool turned down multiple transfer offers for Millar, who received loan interest from clubs in the Championship and Bundesliga.

Loans to Kilmarnock
On January 31, 2019, Millar signed a long-term first-team contract with Liverpool and joined Scottish Premiership side Kilmarnock on loan until the end of the 2018–19 season. He made his debut on February 1 in a 2–1 loss to Heart of Midlothian. He scored his first goal on March 11 against St Mirren.

He returned on loan to Kilmarnock in August 2019.  This loan period was cut short in January 2020 when he returned to his parent club.

Loan to Charlton Athletic

On January 5, 2021, Millar completed his move to Charlton Athletic on loan until the end of the season. He scored his first goal for Charlton on January 26 in a 1–0 league win over MK Dons. Over the season he played 27 games for the club scoring two goals.

Basel
On July 8, 2021, Millar joined Swiss Super League club Basel on a deal until 2025. The transfer fee was reported to be £1.3 million. He made his official debut for the club on July 25, entering as a substitute for Valentin Stocker in an eventual opening day 2-0 victory over Grasshoppers. Millar scored his first goal for Basel on September 19 in a Swiss Cup match against FC Rorschach-Goldach.

International career

Youth

Millar was first involved in the international set-up at the age of 14 in the squad for the Tournoi Montaigu. After being invited to an U20 camp in Costa Rica in 2016, he made his debut in the CONCACAF Under-20 Championship in February 2017. He made three appearances as Canada finished third in Group A and failed to progress to the classification stage. In May 2018, Millar was named to Canada's under-21 squad for the 2018 Toulon Tournament. Millar was named to the Canadian U-23 provisional roster for the 2020 CONCACAF Men's Olympic Qualifying Championship on February 26, 2020.

Senior

In March 2018, Millar was named in John Herdman's first squad as national team manager. In that same camp, Millar made his senior debut and first start for Canada during a 1–0 win over New Zealand, impressing while doing so. In May 2019, Millar was named to the 23-man squad for the 2019 CONCACAF Gold Cup.

In November 2022, Millar was called-up to Canada's squad for the 2022 FIFA World Cup.

Style of play 
Millar's preferred position is as a number nine, but he has been utilised in various roles with Liverpool due to his flexibility. He has been noted for his ability on the left flank. In August 2016, manager Neil Critchley said: "He's a goalscorer. He can run down the side of defenders, he runs in behind, he gives them real problems with his movement and he's a good finisher off both feet. He's got a good brain, good awareness, very calm and can finish. He's a good player, a good all-round player."

Personal life 
Millar is married to Daniela Paniccia, who played for the Penn State Nittany Lions and Oakville Hornets in the Provincial Women's Hockey League. The two have a daughter together.

Career statistics

Club

International

References

External links 

 

1999 births
Living people
Canadian expatriate soccer players
Liverpool F.C. players
Soccer players from Brampton
Sportspeople from Oakville, Ontario
Soccer players from Toronto
Canadian soccer players
Canada men's international soccer players
Fulham F.C. players
Canada men's youth international soccer players
Association football forwards
Canadian expatriate sportspeople in England
Charlton Athletic F.C. players
Kilmarnock F.C. players
FC Basel players
Canadian expatriate sportspeople in Scotland
Expatriate footballers in England
Expatriate footballers in Scotland
North Mississauga SC players
Scottish Professional Football League players
2019 CONCACAF Gold Cup players
2022 FIFA World Cup players